Broken Ear Record is a studio album by American experimental noise band Black Dice. It was released on September 6, 2005, on DFA Records. "Smiling Off" was released as a single.

Track listing
"Snarly Yow" – 8:14
"Smiling Off" – 9:23
"Heavy Manners" – 4:12
"ABA" – 0:56
"Street Dude" – 7:07
"Twins" – 2:04
"Motorcycle" – 6:59

References

Black Dice albums
2005 albums